The following highways are numbered 276:

Canada
Manitoba Provincial Road 276
 Nova Scotia Route 276
 Quebec Route 276

Japan
 Japan National Route 276

United States
 Interstate 276
 U.S. Route 276
 Arkansas Highway 276
 Arkansas Highway 276S
 California State Route 276
 Florida State Road 276
 Georgia State Route 276 (former)
 Iowa Highway 276 (former)
 K-276 (Kansas highway)
 Kentucky Route 276
 Maryland Route 276
 Montana Secondary Highway 276
 New Mexico State Road 276
 New York State Route 276
 Ohio State Route 276
 Pennsylvania Route 276 (former)
 Tennessee State Route 276
 Texas State Highway 276
 Texas State Highway Spur 276 (former)
 Farm to Market Road 276 (Texas)
 Utah State Route 276
 Virginia State Route 276
 Washington State Route 276